Instructure, Inc. is an educational technology company based in Salt Lake City, Utah, United States. It is the developer and publisher of Canvas, a web-based learning management system (LMS), and MasteryConnect, an assessment management system. The company is owned by private-equity firm Thoma Bravo.

History
Founded in 2008 by two BYU graduate students, Brian Whitmer and Devlin Daley, Instructure's initial funding came from Mozy founder Josh Coates, who served as Instructure's CEO from 2010 to 2018 and chairman of the board through 2020, as well as from Epic Ventures.

In December 2010, the Utah Education Network (UEN), which represents a number of Utah colleges and universities, announced that Instructure would be replacing Blackboard. By January 2013, Instructure's platform was in-use by more than 300 colleges, universities, and K-12 districts; the company's customer base had increased to 9 million users by the end of 2013.

In February 2011, Instructure announced they were making their flagship product, Canvas, freely available under an Affero General Public License (AGPL) license as open-source software, a move which garnered press coverage due to its threat to then market leader Blackboard. As of 2020, while the core Canvas remains open-source, according to its GitHub frequently asked questions (FAQ), some Canvas functions and add-ons are proprietary.

In June 2013, Instructure secured $30 million in Series D Funding, bringing their lifetime funding total to $50 million. In February 2015, it raised another $40 million in Series E Funding, raising their lifetime funding total to $90 million. CEO Josh Coates described it as "a pre-IPO round." On November 13, 2015, the firm began trading as a publicly held company on the New York Stock Exchange.

In 2016, Glassdoor named the firm No. 4 on its 'Best Places to Work' list. In 2018, the Salt Lake Tribune named it its No. 6 'Top Work Places' for large businesses.

In December 2019, Instructure announced that Thoma Bravo would acquire the company for $2 billion. Thoma Bravo completed the acquisition of Instructure in March 2020.

In June 2021, Instructure again filed for an Initial Public Offering. The company's IPO took place in July 2021 and it began trading under the symbol INST.

Products

Canvas

Instructure, Inc. was created to support the continued development of a learning management system known as Canvas or Canvas LMS, formally Instructure; once incorporated, the founders changed the name of the software from Instructure to Canvas. The Utah-based company tested the learning management system at several local schools, including Utah State University and Brigham Young University, before officially launching the system.

Canvas is used by some schools, allowing students to submit assignments, answer to discussions, access and upload media using Canvas Studio, and retrieve files from their Google Drive after linking Canvas with their Google account. Like students, Canvas allows teachers to create assignments, discussions, pages, and modules. Teachers can also integrate supported external tools or see what their course is viewed like as a student; this is known as "Student View". As of 2020, Canvas is used in approximately 4,000 institutions worldwide.

Instructure launched its Canvas iOS app in 2011, soon to be shortly followed by its Canvas Android app in 2013, enabling support for mobile access to the platform. The apps were split into three sections: Canvas Student, Canvas Teacher, and Canvas Parent. Canvas Student allowed students to access Canvas' student features, Canvas Teacher, similar to students, allowed teachers to access Canvas' teacher features, and Canvas Parent allowed parents of K-12 students to stay informed on their child's assignments, grades, and overall schooling, all of which being similar to the functions of the website.

In August 2020, 16 states across the United States confirmed a partnership with Instructure to adopt its Canvas platform for their educational institutions. The states said that by adopting Canvas as a statewide solution to the challenges raised by the global COVID-19 pandemic, they hoped to provide stronger support to students and educators.

Canvas Catalog
In 2014, Instructure launched Canvas Catalog, a course catalog tool designed to help schools market their course offerings to non-traditional learners and professional development.

Canvas Studio
In 2016, Instructure launched Canvas Studio, branded initially as Arc, a video learning platform tightly integrated with Canvas designed to deliver asynchronous video content and quizzing, as well as a video editing and archiving functionality.

Portfolium
In 2019, Instructure acquired Portfolium and integrated their pathways, Program Assessment, and ePortfolio network into the Canvas. Portfolium is designed to simplify the assessment of student learning, showcase evidence of knowledge, and keep students engaged along pathways to prepare them for careers.

MasteryConnect
In 2019, Instructure acquired MasteryConnect, a K-12 assessment management system that enables data-driven instruction and personalized learning with tools for formative and interim assessments, teacher collaboration, ae-acquire-certica-solutions-make-learning-personal-every-student|title = Instructure to Acquire Certica Solutions to Make Learning Personal for Every Student}}</ref> which provides assessment content and analytics primarily to K-12 districts in the United States. Products added through this acquisition include the Navigate Item Bank, CASE Benchmarks, CASE Item Banks, Videri, Academic Benchmarks, Certify, DataConnect, and prebuilt formative offerings.

Impact
In 2021, Instructure acquired EesySoft, a Dutch educational technology company, and rebranded the EesySoft product to Impact by Instructure. Impact is designed to help educators and students use educational technology products more effectively by embedding guides, tutorials, and prompts into the software.

Bridge
On February 18, 2015, Instructure officially launched Bridge, a cloud-based corporate learning management system. This launch followed $40 million raised in Series E funding, led by Insight Venture Partners. EPIC Ventures and Bessemer Venture Partners also participated in the funding. This round raised their total lifetime funding close to $90 million. At launch, Bridge served 6 corporate clients, including Oregon State University, which had also been using Canvas for their students since fall 2015. Bridge now serves more than 500 clients.

On February 15, 2021, it was announced Bridge would be acquired by Learning Technologies Group (LTG). The deal to officially acquire Bridge completed on February 26, 2021.

See also
 History of virtual learning environments
 Virtual learning environment

References 

2008 establishments in the United States
2008 establishments in Utah
2015 initial public offerings
2019 mergers and acquisitions
American companies established in 2008
Companies based in Salt Lake City
Companies formerly listed on the New York Stock Exchange
Education companies established in 2008
Educational software companies
Educational technology companies of the United States
Learning management systems
Learning management systems
Private equity portfolio companies
Software companies based in Utah
Software companies established in 2008
Software companies of the United States
Virtual learning environments